Conor James Coventry (born 25 March 2000) is a professional footballer who plays as a midfielder for EFL Championship club Rotherham United, on loan from Premier League club West Ham United. He has also played on loan for Lincoln City, Peterborough United and Milton Keynes Dons. Born in England, he represents the Republic of Ireland at youth international level. 

Coventry is the Republic of Ireland's all-time record holder for the most appearances at U21 level with 28 caps.

Club career

West Ham United
Coventry joined the youth academy of West Ham United at the age of 10. He scored his first goal for the under-23 team on his debut on 20 February 2017, in a 2–0 victory against Fulham. During the 2017–18 season, he played ten times in Professional Development League and four times in EFL Trophy and won the Academy Player of the Year award at the end of the season on 25 April 2018.

On 25 May 2018, Coventry signed his first professional contract with the club. About it, he said "I’ve worked for this for a long time so yes, I'm really happy to sign the deal". On 26 September, he made his first team debut, coming on as a substitute for Pedro Obiang in an 8–0 victory against Macclesfield Town in the EFL Cup. In January 2020, Coventry signed a new contract with West Ham which would see him stay at the club until 2023.

He signed on loan for League One club Lincoln City until the end of the 2019–20 season on 10 January 2020.

Coventry signed a season-long loan deal with Championship team Peterborough United on 31 August 2021. He made 12 appearances for Peterborough before returning to West Ham in January 2022. On 18 January 2022, Coventry joined League One club Milton Keynes Dons on loan for the remainder of the 2021–22 season, playing his first game in the No. 14 shirt for the Dons on 22 January in a home loss versus Doncaster, where he was substituted in the 75th minute by Hiram Boateng. 

Whilst on loan, Coventry scored his first professional league goal on 5 April 2022 in a 2–1 home win over Crewe Alexandra. He went on to make 22 appearances for MK Dons as the club secured a third-placed play-off finish.

On 7 August 2022, Coventry made his Premier League debut as a 92nd-minute substitute for Pablo Fornals in a 2–0 home defeat to Manchester City.

On 26 January 2023, Coventry joined Championship team Rotherham United on loan until the end of the 2022–23 season.

International career
Born in England, Coventry was eligible for both the England and Republic of Ireland national teams through his mother. Opting for the Republic of Ireland, he played regularly for the country's U17 and U19 sides before making his debut for Stephen Kenny's U21 team during the 2019 Toulon Tournament where the side finished in fourth place. Coventry was later named the team's captain and went on to feature regularly for the side.

He was called up to the Republic of Ireland senior squad for the first time in March 2021, replacing the injured Conor Hourihane in the squad for the World Cup Qualification matches against Serbia and Luxembourg and a friendly against Qatar, although did not make an appearance.

On 6 June 2022, Coventry made his 25th appearance for the U21 side, in a 3–1 win over Montenegro, setting a new national record for appearances at that level by a single player breaking the record of Graham Barrett.

Career statistics

Honours
Individual
 West Ham United Academy Player of the Year: 2017–18
FAI Under-21 International Player of the Year: 2021

References

External links
 Conor Coventry at West Ham United F.C.
 Conor Coventry at the Football Association of Ireland  
 
 
 

2000 births
Living people
Republic of Ireland association footballers
Republic of Ireland youth international footballers
English footballers
English people of Irish descent
Association football midfielders
West Ham United F.C. players
Lincoln City F.C. players
Peterborough United F.C. players
Milton Keynes Dons F.C. players
Rotherham United F.C. players
English Football League players
Premier League players
Footballers from the London Borough of Waltham Forest